JoAn Wood (born June 3, 1934) was an American politician from Idaho. Wood was a Republican member of the Idaho House of Representatives who served consecutive terms for a total of 32 years.

Early life 
On June 3, 1934, Wood was born in Milo, Idaho. Wood graduated from Ririe High School.

Career 
Wood is a farmer and a rancher.

Wood was first elected to the Idaho House of Representatives in 1981 and served till 2014.

Awards 
 2014 Water Statesman Award. Presented by Idaho Water Users Association (January 23, 2014).

Personal life 
Wood's husband was Thomas Wood. They have 5 children. Wood and her family live at Rigby, Idaho. Wood is a Mormon.

References

External links 
 JoAn Wood at ballotpedia.org
 JoAn E. Wood at openstates.org

1934 births
American Latter Day Saints
Women state legislators in Idaho
Republican Party members of the Idaho House of Representatives
Living people
People from Bonneville County, Idaho
People from Jefferson County, Idaho
21st-century American women